Euptychodera is a genus of shield-backed bugs in the family Scutelleridae. There is one described species in Euptychodera, E. corrugata.

References

Further reading

 
 
 

Scutelleridae
Articles created by Qbugbot